Emily C. A. Snyder (born September 10, 1977) is an American theatre maker, actor, and novelist.  She is the co-founder and artistic director of Turn to Flesh Productions (TTF), a New York City theatre company, and the author of the Twelve Kingdoms fantasy series as well as Jane Austen parodies.  

Since 2008, she has focused primarily on the creation of new verse plays with vibrant roles for women.  She is a passionate advocate for women and those underrepresented in classical theatre, writing several articles on the need for better parity and representation in theatre.  

Snyder is a feminist and was raised Catholic.  At present, Snyder identifies as she/they and aromantic.

Early life and education 
Snyder was born in Amherst, Massachusetts, where her father, John L. Snyder was a student of computer programming, and her mother, Christine Enright Snyder managed the Newman Center.  She is the eldest of four children, attending several schools as her family moved up and down the Eastern Seaboard.

She graduated summa cum laude from Emerson College in Boston, Massachusetts, where she received her master's degree in theatre education.  She received her bachelor's degree from Franciscan University of Steubenville double majoring in English: Literature and Drama.

In 2000, Snyder trained in John Barton's approach to Shakespeare's verse with Vivian Heilbron and Bernard Lloyd, culminating in a performance in Stratford-upon-Avon, where she portrayed Rosalind from As You Like It.  She has since studied with the Shakespeare Forum in New York City, where she also taught writing and performing new verse.

Snyder is the host of Hamlet to Hamilton: Exploring Verse Drama, an education podcast laying out the tools of writing and performing new verse.

Shakespeare 
Snyder's first Shakespearean role was as Feste the Jester in Twelfth Night at University.  She has since gone on to direct 11 of Shakespeare's plays, including A Midsummer Night's Dream twice, and performed in 25 of his plays, including portraying Brutus in Julius Caesar and Prospero in The Tempest.  She has also appeared as Countess Olivia in Twelfth Night and Cordelia in King Lear through ChopBard podcast.

From 2006–2012, Snyder founded and served as Artistic Director of Gaudete Academy, a summer Shakespeare camp for adolescents and young adults presenting classical work in central Massachusetts.  Simultaneously, she expanded the drama programs of two high school programs in Hudson, Massachusetts, serving as adjunct faculty for the conservatory program at Hudson High School.

Drawing on her studies in England, combined with her own kinaesthetic approach to Shakespeare, Snyder has given classes up and down the eastern seaboard on performing Shakespeare, as well as writing new verse.

As of 2022, Snyder is a PhD candidate on writing new verse with the Shakespeare Institute in Stratford-upon-Avon.

Turn to Flesh Productions 
In 2012, Snyder moved to New York City and founded TURN TO FLESH PRODUCTIONS (TTF) with fellow Steubenville alumna, Michelle Kafel.  The company's mission is to help develop new texts in heightened language, such as verse, with vibrant roles for those historically excluded from classical western art.  

Snyder served as the Artistic Director until 2021, when she handed over the reigns to her business partner, Chris Rivera.  An article for BroadwayWorld elaborated that this change in leadership was very much in line with the company's greater mission:"The promotion signals a shift in the New York theater scene. Rivera will be one of a very small number of Latiné artistic directors in New York City who are running theaters not specifically geared toward the Latiné community. In their former roles with TTF, Rivera acted as a guide star for equity and inclusion, championing initiatives to include more colorful casts and raising the bar for representation on the TTF stage. They were instrumental in growing the focus of the company from "creating vibrant roles for women" to also creating roles for LGBT+ actors and BIPOC."

New verse drama 
In 2008, while attending Emerson College, Snyder began writing and studying new verse drama, beginning with her first full-length, five act, blank verse play, Cupid and Psyche.

The Love and Death Trilogy 
The Love and Death Trilogy consists of three plays in blank verse, combining the major Greek myths of Cupid, Aphrodite, Adonis, Persephone, Hades, Orpheus, Eurydice, and Psyche into one story.

The plays consist of Persephone Rises, covering Persephone's abduction into the Underworld, The Seduction of Adonis, which includes the myth of Adonis and Orpheus and Eurydice, as the Loves and Deaths continue to war, and culminating in Cupid and Psyche, about the marriage of Love to Reason, and the conclusion of the various story threads.

The Love and Death Trilogy received a developmental workshop in 2018 through Turn to Flesh Productions for their fifth season celebration, directed by Snyder.

Cupid and Psyche 
In 2009, Cupid and Psyche received a workshop presentation at Emerson College, directed by Brenda Huggins. Snyder originally wanted to adapt the myth into an opera, but Huggins rejected that idea.  Consequently, Snyder decided to write Cupid and Psyche in blank verse.  The play was well-received, although Snyder was unsatisfied with her first attempt to explore the myth, and deemed that draft her "Bad Quarto."

Snyder revised the play significantly for its second developmental production in 2014 through her newly founded company, Turn to Flesh Productions.  She credits collaborator James Parenti, and the workshop Dare Lab for giving her space to play and develop the "Good Quarto" version, which is the official script available today.

Parenti, who played Cupid in the original sold-out New York City run in 2014, also went on to develop her early drafts of Persephone Rises and The Seduction of Adonis, including performing a scene at the Darkroom Series with Laura Hooper, reprising her role as Aphrodite.  Snyder then worked on Parenti's verse play, May Violets Spring: A New Story for a New Ophelia, first as verse coach for the 2014 premiere with Dare Lab, and then as director for the 2016 production through TTF.

Cupid and Psyche was a semi-finalist with the Princess Grace Awards in 2010 and again in 2019.  It was also a semi-finalist with the American Shakespeare Center in 2018.  It received its first Virginia premiere in 2023 at Mary Baldwin College.

Shakespeare-inspired plays 
In 2017, with the announcement of the American Shakespeare Center's (ASC) call for scripts inspired by the Bard, Snyder turned her attention towards the creation of new verse plays for the Shakespeare's New Contemporaries program.  Snyder's first Shakespeare play, A Comedy of Heirors, or The Imposters, received acclaim, being named a finalist with the ASC, as well as "The Top 15 NYC Plays of '17" by A Work Unfinishing.  The play is in conversation with several of Shakespeare's comedies, including characters from The Comedy of Errors, Twelfth Night, As You Like It, and Much Ado About Nothing.

The following year, in 2018, Snyder wrote The Merry Widows of Windsor, a sequel to Shakespeare's The Merry Wives of Windsor.  This received two staged reading through the Sheen Center in New York City, where Snyder took one of the titular roles as Alice Ford, opposite frequent collaborator, Abby Wilde (Zoey 101) as Margaret Page.  Snyder did not bring Falstaff into this production, but did reprise her take on Dogberry and Verges, which also appear in A Comedy of Heirors.

In 2019, Snyder began developing her take on Romeo and Juliet, originally titled Romeo and Juliet Combative.  Although Snyder did not originally intend to rewrite any of Shakespeare's play, having successfully directed the show in 2008 with Keith Caram, she eventually became convinced by her collaborators to provide additional scenes and soliloquies.  TTF provided a staged reading with Snyder in the titular role of Juliet opposite Ari Dalbert (The Inhumans). On the success of this, TTF decided to give the play, now titled Juliet and Her Romeo a full production at the Kraine Theatre, as part of their new residency with Frigid NYC for Valentine's 2020, with Snyder reprising her role of Juliet.

French farce 
In 2018, Snyder produced The Other, Other Woman, a French farce play, written largely in rhyming couplets.  She first premiered a sneak peek scene, where she played the prologue and Mother Abbess at the Sheen Center.  The developmental production at El Barrio Art Space, NYC, was well-received, with reviewer Zelda Knapp pointing out Snyder's skill with verse:"When the rhyming couplets break apart into simple and honest speech, the audience takes a collective breath and holds it. The ache of love unexpressed and inexpressible."Snyder herself seemed to indicate that the play was largely autobiographical and cathartic to write.

Medieval plays 
In 2019, Snyder premiered her feminist Arthurian duology, The Table Round and The Siege Perilous.  Combining the myths of King Arthur, Queen Guinevere, and Sir Lancelot, Merlin vs. Morgan le Fay, the Lady of Shalott, Sir Gawain and the Green Knight, Tristan and Isolde, the Grail Quest and the Fall of Camelot, this ambitious duology was well received in New York City.  Like many of Snyder's plays, she developed the script through improvisations and public readings, including a "spit draft" presentation, which is a partially completed script with silly interstitial materials, presented as a performance.  Snyder had been writing her take on the Arthur myth as early as 2017, where she apparently had first been considering Tom Hiddleston for the role of Britain's most famous king.

Audio 
Snyder has written and performed many audio pieces, from podcasting to audio drama.

Podcaster

Hamlet to Hamilton: Exploring Verse Drama 
In 2020, Snyder founded her podcast, Hamlet to Hamilton: Exploring Verse Drama, with co-creator and audio engineer, Colin Kovarik.  The podcast, which chronicles Snyder's discoveries about writing verse drama and lessons to the listener about how to create their own work, began when Snyder and Kovarik were looking for work at the beginning of the 2020 pandemic.  The first episode, "Defining Verse Drama" premiered on 7 October 2020 on the Anchor platform. 

In addition to regular seasons, Snyder and Kovarik interview contemporary verse dramatists and artists, as well as hosting round tables and one-on-one talks about lessons learned.  Some notable interviews include playwrights Peter Oswald and Glyn Maxwell, both of whom premiered contemporary verse plays at Shakespeare's Globe.

Writer

Quinn Originals 
Between 22-29 September 2022, the audio erotica app, Quinn, premiered a new audio romance series penned by Snyder, called The Inventor's Apprentice.  The three part series was voiced by Thomas Doherty, directed by Rob Valentine, with sound design by Ross Burman.  It was produced by WTC and Quinn Inc.  Following the time traveling adventures of Horatio Godkin and Arabella Bellamy in the Victorian Era, the three part series debuted between 22-29 September 2022.   The series garnered praise particularly for its presentation of the feminine gaze in the world of audio romance and erotica.

Quirky Voices Presents 
Working for Sarah Golding of Quirky Voices Presents, Snyder penned several short pieces.  Her two-woman audio drama, Rosa Krantz and Gilda Stern Aren't Dead won several awards, including "Best Ensemble" and "Best Chemistry" for its two leads, Sarah Golding and Fiona Thraille.  The audio was released 8 March 2021 in time for International Woman's Day.

Snyder also provided the script for Quirky Voices' monologue series, including the choral piece, "Here" and the solo-voiced "The Distance That's Between Us Is the Moon."  The latter won the 2019 Audio Drama Verse Awards for Writing of a New Spoken Word Production.

Voice Actor 
Snyder has lent her voice to several projects.  Some notable characters include her creation of the shapeshifter, CiCi Stratos, in Once Upon A Monster of the Week, an actual play podcast from Haunted Griffin Entertainment; Caitlin O'Sullivan in The Ghost Ship, an audio drama based on the Boston Metaphysical Society from Queen of Mercia Productions, created and written by Madeline Holly-Rosing;  and Hestren in Starfall, created and written by Claudia Elvidge.

True to her love for Shakespeare, Snyder has also appeared on several Shakespeare-adjacent podcasts.  For ChopBard she performed as the Countess Olivia in Twelfth Night and Cordelia in King Lear.  Snyder also appeared on Hamlet Isn't Dead's Shakespeare Quiz podcast, That is the Question.  Earlier, Snyder had been interviewed by them, speaking about Cupid and Psyche, verse drama, and TURN TO FLESH PRODUCTIONS on their podcast, Tales Told by A(n) HIDiot.

Novels 
Snyder cut her teeth writing the Twelve Kingdoms novels, including Niamh and the Hermit and Charming the Moon.  Her debut novel was favorably reviewed, with comparisons to J. R. R. Tolkien, Lord Dunsany, C. S. Lewis, and the Brothers Grimm.  Niamh was released immediately before the release of the Lord of the Rings movies, and at the beginning of Harry Potter-mania, inviting some to hail the novel as a Christian alternative to the Potter franchise, despite the vast differences in style.

In 2009, Snyder released her Jane Austen satire, Nachtstürm Castle, a sequel to Northanger Abbey.  Continuing her love of the fantastic, the story transplants Austen's Gothic-loving heroine into the pages of an actual Gothic adventure, which the heroine believes is a play created for her delight by her doting husband.  The novel became a cult classic, being first published serially on The Republic of Pemberley, before being picked up by Girlebooks, and eventually released directly through Amazon as both an e-book and an audio book, narrated by Suzanne T. Fortin.  At one point, between the novel's second and third printings, remaindered copies of the book were selling for several hundred pounds on Amazon.uk.  Snyder followed this with the release of her Austen inspired short stories, in Letters of Love & Deception.

References

Living people
1977 births
American women dramatists and playwrights
American women novelists
21st-century American dramatists and playwrights
21st-century American novelists
21st-century American women writers
American stage actresses
21st-century American actresses
People from Amherst, Massachusetts
Novelists from Massachusetts
Actresses from Massachusetts
Emerson College alumni
Franciscan University of Steubenville alumni